Sergi López Segú (6 October 1967 – 4 November 2006) was a Spanish footballer who played as a central defender.

During his career he played professionally for three clubs, mainly Barcelona. He appeared in 62 La Liga matches during eight seasons (two goals), also representing in the competition Mallorca and Zaragoza.

After some personal problems, López (the older brother of Barcelona and Valencia's Gerard López) died by suicide in 2006 at the age of 39.

Club career
Born in Granollers, Barcelona, Catalonia, in his early years López was a promising talent, and both FC Barcelona and Real Madrid were interested in signing him for its youth squads. The former's scout, Oriol Tort, whom at that time also followed players like Sergi Barjuán and Pep Guardiola, convinced the López family to choose his club.

López started out in Barcelona's cantera, with younger brothers Juli and Gerard following later. He made his first-team debut on 6 November 1988, in a 0–0 away draw against Real Valladolid where he came on as a 46th-minute substitute for Gary Lineker. Including Copa del Rey and European matches, he eventually totalled less than 30 appearances, and helped Barça win one La Liga championship, two Spanish Cups and the 1988–89 edition of the UEFA Cup Winners' Cup to which he contributed one hour of play in a 0–0 home draw to Aarhus Gymnastikforening in the quarter-finals' second leg.

In summer 1991, López moved to RCD Mallorca, but was transferred to fellow league side Real Zaragoza after only one season. Although he never featured much, he still helped the Aragonese to a domestic cup, being discarded by manager Víctor Fernández for the final of the following Cup Winners' Cup. 

After a short spell with modest CF Gavà in Segunda División B, the 28-year-old López retired due to recurrent knee problems.

Post-retirement and death
After his football career, López moved to Argentina where he married, and where his only child was born. The marriage failed eventually and this, in combination with the early end of his playing days, resulted in clinical depression. While still in Argentina he was taken to a psychiatric hospital, but was forced to return to Spain due to financial problems; he committed suicide by throwing himself under a train on 4 November 2006, at 39.

López's funeral, held on 6 November, was attended by many notable people from within the world of football. Former teammates Guillermo Amor, Txiki Begiristain, Guardiola and Sergi (Barcelona), Xavi Aguado and Santiago Aragón (Zaragoza) and Josep Serer (Mallorca) were all present, alongside Barcelona president Joan Laporta and player Samuel Eto'o, former Valencia CF president Pedro Cortés and the full squad and staff of AS Monaco FC (to support brother Gerard, who represented the Monegasque club).

Honours
Barcelona
UEFA Cup Winners' Cup: 1988–89
Copa del Rey: 1989–90
Copa Catalunya: 1991

Zaragoza
Copa del Rey: 1993–94
UEFA Cup Winners' Cup: 1994–95

References

External links

1967 births
2006 suicides
Footballers from Granollers
Spanish footballers
Association football defenders
La Liga players
Segunda División players
Segunda División B players
FC Barcelona Atlètic players
FC Barcelona players
RCD Mallorca players
Real Zaragoza players
CF Gavà players
Spain under-21 international footballers
Catalonia international footballers
Suicides by train
Suicides in Spain